Two ships named Bengal sailed as East Indiamen for the British East India Company (EIC). Both were ill-fated.

 made four complete voyages but foundered with no trace while homeward bound from the fifth.
 made one voyage for the EIC, but was burnt on the homeward leg of her second voyage.

In addition, several other vessels named Bengal had a connection to the EIC, though they were not Indiamen.
Bengal was a galley built in 1722 to serve as an escort ship at Bombay to protect Indiamen from pirates on the Malabar Coast. A pirate fleet captured her in 1730.
Bengal was a 74-gun ship that the EIC had built and that it donated to the British Royal Navy. The Navy renamed her .

ship names